Josef Weber (18 April 1898 – 5 March 1970) was a German international footballer.

References

1898 births
1970 deaths
Association football midfielders
German footballers
Germany international footballers